The Gate is a 2014 French-Belgian-Cambodian drama film directed by Régis Wargnier, based on the books by François Bizot. The film debuted at the Telluride Film Festival on 29 August 2014. It was also screened in the Special Presentations section of the 2014 Toronto International Film Festival in September 2014.

Cast 
 Raphaël Personnaz as François Bizot
 Olivier Gourmet as Marsac
 Phoeung Kompheak as Douch 
 Thorn Thanet as Néang
 Boren Chhith as Lay
 Rathana Soth as Phuong
 Steve Driesen as Father Vernet

References

External links 
 

2014 films
Cambodian multilingual films
2010s French-language films
French drama films
2014 drama films
Films set in Cambodia
Films directed by Régis Wargnier
Drama films based on actual events
French multilingual films
Gaumont Film Company films
2014 multilingual films
Belgian drama films
Belgian multilingual films
2010s French films